Prosheliomyia formosensis is a species of tachinid flies in the genus Prosheliomyia of the family Tachinidae.

Distribution
Taiwan.

External links

Diptera of Asia
Endemic fauna of Taiwan
Dexiinae
Taxa named by Charles Henry Tyler Townsend
Insects described in 1927